Ludwig Briand (born 9 May 1981 at Soisy-sous-Montmorency) is a French actor. Named after Ludwig van Beethoven, he got his first acting job in 1991 at the age of ten as Gavroche in the stage musical Les Misérables. Then another musical Paul And Virginie as Paul. After his role in the worldwide hit film Un indien dans la ville he returned to the stage as the lead in the musical Petit Arthur.

Filmography

Un indien dans la ville (1994)... Mimi-Siku
Fantaghirò 5 (1996)... Masala

External links

French fanpage

1981 births
Living people
People from Soisy-sous-Montmorency
French male film actors
French male musical theatre actors